USS Croatan (CVE-25) (previously AVG-25 then ACV-25) was a Bogue-class escort carrier launched on 1 August 1942 by the Seattle-Tacoma Shipbuilding Corporation of Seattle, Washington, under a Maritime Commission contract; sponsored by Mrs. J. S. Russell; and commissioned on 28 April 1943.

Service history
Croatan sailed from San Diego, California on 2 July 1943, and arrived at Norfolk, Virginia on 19 July. As the nucleus for a hunter-killer group, she sailed on 5 August for antisubmarine operations in the Atlantic covering the movement of convoys. Her planes had two skirmishes with surfaced submarines, and on 5 September initiated night flying operations from escort carriers. She returned to Norfolk on 22 September.

From 17 October-29 December 1943, Croatan made two voyages to Casablanca ferrying aircraft and plane crews for the North African operations. After another antisubmarine patrol from 14 January-27 February 1944, she took part in tests with the Naval Research Laboratory at Annapolis, Maryland. From 24 March-11 May, Croatan made a most successful patrol. She was also successful in her patrol from 2 June-22 July. On 10 June, Croatans planes and escorts , Huse, and  attacked  and remained in constant contact with it, forcing it to surface the next day.

Following a brief overhaul and radar tests with the Naval Research Laboratory, Croatan put to sea again on 20 August 1944. On 15 September, she aided survivors from the destroyer  which had foundered in a hurricane. Returning to Norfolk on 1 October, Croatan next sailed for antisubmarine training at Guantanamo Bay Naval Base and Bermuda, then proceeded to provide air cover for a high-speed east bound task force, returning to New York on 4 February 1945. For the next month, she qualified pilots in carrier operations, then sailed from Norfolk on 25 March to join a barrier line to intercept German submarines as part of Operation Teardrop. Croatan returned by way of Naval Station Argentia, Newfoundland to New York City on 14 May for overhaul.

From 15 September to 3 November, Croatan qualified aviators at Quonset Point, then cleared Norfolk on 23 November on the first of two transatlantic voyages to bring troops home from Le Havre, France.

Croatan was placed out of commission in reserve at Norfolk on 20 May 1946.

USNS Croatan

Reactivated, Croatan was assigned to the Military Sea Transportation Service in a noncommissioned status, manned by a civilian crew on 16 June 1958. In August 1963, she carried 23 F-104 Starfighters delivered to the Royal Norwegian Air Force 331 Squadron at Bodø, Norway. In March 1964 she carried also F-104 Starfighter and  delivered to the Royal Hellenic Air Force. In October 1964, she served as an experimental ship under NASA control until May 1965. In August 1965, she helped transport helicopters for the US Army's 1st Cavalry Division (Airmobile) to Vietnam.  She was stricken for disposal on 15 September 1970 and sold for scrap in 1971.

References

External links
  USS CROATAN   (ACV-25) (later CVE-25, CVHE-25, CVU-25 and AKV-43)
 USNS Croatan — Tough Mission for Diplomats in Dungarees (story & photo)

Bogue-class escort carriers of the United States Navy
Ships built in Seattle
1942 ships
World War II escort aircraft carriers of the United States